The Panasonic Lumix DMC-GF7 is an interchangeable lens mirrorless system digital camera announced by Panasonic on January 20, 2015.

References

GF7